The Oak Ridge Institute for Science and Education (ORISE) is a U.S. Department of Energy asset providing expertise in STEM workforce development, scientific and technical reviews, and the evaluation of radiation exposure and environmental contamination.

ORISE performs this work for DOE and its national laboratory system and for non-DOE entities through the Strategic Partnership Projects program. ORISE is managed by Oak Ridge Associated Universities (ORAU).

United_States_Department_of_Energy
Oak Ridge, Tennessee